Shinji Ilabas Mo Na Ang Helicopter is the second studio album by the Filipino dance-punk band Pedicab, released July 11, 2008 on MCA Records.

Track listing
"FX" - 2:55
"Simulan Mo Na" - 3:56
"Ang Pusa Mo" - 3:51
"Deafening Silence" - 2:36
"Breaking Away" - 3:00
"Good to Go" - 4:26
"Put the Pieces Together" - 2:56
"Follow Through" - 3:25
"Laway" - 3:14
"Pa-Taste" - 3:01
"Mixed Feelings" - 2:43
"Deep Eyes" - 10:17

References

2008 albums
Pedicab (band) albums